Koiak 16 - Coptic Calendar - Koiak 18

The seventeenth day of the Coptic month of Koiak, the fourth month of the Coptic year. On a common year, this day corresponds to December 13, of the Julian Calendar, and December 26, of the Gregorian Calendar. This day falls in the Coptic season of Peret, the season of emergence. This day falls in the Nativity Fast.

Commemorations

Saints 

 The departure of Saint Elias, in Mount Bashwash 
 The departure of Saint Luke the Stylite

Other commemorations 

 The relocation of the body of Saint Luke the Stylite

References 

Days of the Coptic calendar